The Scanian Hussar Regiment (K 5) was a Swedish Army cavalry unit which operated in various forms the years 1658–1709 and 1709–1927.

Commanding officers
Regimental commanders from 1658 to 1927.

1658–1659: Erik Leijonhufvud
1659–1679: G H Lybecker
1679–1686: Gyllenstierna
168?–1694: Nils Gyllenstierna
1694?–1694 Carl Gustaf Rehnskiöld
1698–1704: H I Ridderhielm
1704–1709: Gustaf Horn af Marienborg
1709–1719: H Gyllenbielke
1719–1727: G D Hasenkampff
1727–1753: J C von Düring
1753–1762: R Barnekow
1762–1762: F U Sparre
1762–1765: G A Horn
1765–1772: B G Frölich
1772–1796: P J B von Platen
1796–1809: B Cederström
1809–1813: H H von Essen
1813–1824: C Thott
1824–1829: H R Horn
1829–1841: D H Stierncrona
1841–1848: P O Liedberg
1848–1853: G A F W von Essen
1853–1856: P Sjöcrona
1856–1869: F W R Fock
1869–1884: Gustaf Oscar Peyron
1884–1898: C G Bergenstråhle
1898–1907: E T Grönwall
1907–1912: Axel Ribbing
1912–1916: Philip von Platen
1916–1924: Claes Cederström
1924–1927: Otto Ramel

Names, designations and locations

See also
List of Swedish cavalry regiments

Footnotes

References

Notes

Print

Cavalry regiments of the Swedish Army
Disbanded units and formations of Sweden
Military units and formations established in 1658
Military units and formations disestablished in 1709
Military units and formations established in 1709
Military units and formations disestablished in 1927
1658 establishments in Sweden
1709 disestablishments in Sweden
1709 establishments in Sweden
1927 disestablishments in Sweden
Helsingborg Garrison